David Aston is an actor from Auckland, New Zealand who played the character Rhineheart in the 1999, Hollywood movie The Matrix. He also works as presenter for non-broadcast in-house videos, televisions commercials, voiceover artist and singer.

Early life
David Aston received Diploma in Drama from University of Auckland, Theatre Corporate. His early performance were for Mercury Theatre Corporate at Centrepointe Theatre from 1979 to 1989 where he played Shakespearian roles like King Lear, Macbeth, Petruchio, Oberon.

Theatre plays
David Aston has acted in many theatre plays for Mercury Theatre, Auckland Theatre Company, Silo Theatre, Fortune Theatre, Court Theatre.

Mercury theatre plays
 Turondat (1990)
 Fiddler on the Roof (1989)
 West Wide Story (1987)

Auckland theatre company plays
 The Crucible (2006, as Thomas Putnam)
 Equus (2005)
 Caligula (2004)
 Copenhagen (2001)

Silo theatre plays
 Plenty (2006)
 The Jungle (2006)
 Closer (2004)
 You my only one? (2003)

Fortune theatre plays
 Split down the middle (2001)
 Art (2000)

Court theatre plays
 The God Boy (1999)

Other plays
 Phantom of the opera (1998, Tour of Japan)
 Hamlet/Macbeth (1998, Tour of Auckland School)
 Arcadia (1997)
 Hamlet (1997, Tour of Auckland School)
 Blood Brothers (1994, Australia-New Zealand Tour)
 Restless Ecstasy (2002)

Television
 Shortland Street (2010)
 Fatal Contact: Bird Flu in America (2006)
 Not Only But Always (2004)
 Street Legal (series III & IV, 2002)
 Duggan Dog's Breakfast (1999)
 Xena: Warrior Princess (1995)
 Riding High (1995)
 Hercules: The Legendary Journeys (1995)
 Coverstory (1994)
 True Life Stories (1994)
 Deepwater Haven (1994)
 High Tide (1994)
 Shortland Street (1992–93)
 White Fang (1993)
 Soldier Soldier III (1993)
 In Touch FM (1993)
 Homeward Bound (1992)
 Marlin Bay (1992)
 Gloss III (1989)
 The Seekers (1985)
 Country GP (1984)

Filmography

References

External links
 

1953 births
Living people
New Zealand male television actors
New Zealand male stage actors
University of Auckland alumni
New Zealand male soap opera actors
20th-century New Zealand male actors
21st-century New Zealand male actors